Rice and beans, or beans and rice, is a category of dishes from many cultures around the world, whereby the staple foods of rice and beans are combined in some manner. The grain and legume combination provides several important nutrients and many calories, and both foods are widely available. The beans are usually seasoned, while the rice may be plain or seasoned. The two components may be mixed together, separated on the plate, or served separately.

Description

The dish usually consists of white or brown rice accompanied by cooked brown, red or black dry beans (typically Phaseolus vulgaris or Vigna unguiculata) and seasoned in various ways. This dish is also commonly served with sides of stewed chicken, pork, beef, potato salad, boiled potatoes, and many other sides from many different cultures. In many areas, beans and rice are often served side by side rather than combined.  Either way, they may be considered a meal, frequently with a topping of meat or chicken.  Meat or other ingredients are sometimes placed atop beans and rice or, less frequently, mixed into it.

Different regions have different preferences.  In Brazil, for example, black beans are more popular in Paraná,  Rio de Janeiro, Rio Grande do Sul and Santa Catarina, while in most other parts of the country these are mostly only used in feijoadas.  The New Orleans specialty known as "red beans and rice" is often accompanied by a side of smoked sausage or a fried pork chop.

History

The Americas
Genetic analyses of the common bean Phaseolus shows  that it originated in Mesoamerica, and subsequently spread southward, along with maize and squash, traditional companion crops.   Asian rice was introduced to Mexico and Brazil during the colonial era by the Spanish and the Portuguese.  However, it has recently been discovered that the indigenous peoples of the Amazon had already cultivated a distant relative of Asian rice of the same genus Oryza some 4,000 years ago, and were growing it alongside maize and squash, traditional companion crops of beans, which were also by that time present in South America.  Some recent scholarship suggests that enslaved Africans may also have played an active role in the establishment of rice in the New World. It is also one of the most common foods in some Spanish-speaking countries.

Nutritional significance
Beans and rice are very nutritious. Rice is rich in starch, an excellent source of energy. Rice also has iron and some protein. Beans also contain a good amount of iron and a greater amount of protein than rice. Together they make up a complete protein, which provides each of the amino acids the body cannot make for itself.(source?)

Culture
In some Latin American states and countries, beans and rice are commonly eaten as everyday lunch, along with a different variety of meats and vegetables. It is also common to prepare dinner using the lunch leftovers.  Beans and rice are especially popular in Brazil, which is the world's third largest producer of dry beans and the largest consumer of rice in the Americas.

International dishes and variations

Worldwide, there are many dishes with a base of beans and rice, which vary in their cooking and additional ingredients. Variations exist regionally, as cultures shape the dishes to their own preferences. In countries near or in the Caribbean, these dishes are simply known as rice and beans, in which the dish is cooked in coconut milk, the following is a list of variations:
 Brazil: feijoada
 Chile: arroz con porotos.
 Caribbean: rice and peas
 Colombia: calentao
 Archipelago of San Andrés, Providencia and Santa Catalina:  rice and beans
 Bandeja paisa, a traditional dish made with kidney beans and rice 
 Costa Rica:  gallo pinto and in the Caribbean (Puerto Limón and Puerto Viejo) there is rice and beans in which rice and beans are cooked with coconut milk and habanero chili (locally known as Panamanian chile) is added.
 Cuba: There are two main variations:
 Moros y cristianos: also known as just moros, it is made with black beans. If made with red beans, it would be considered congris.
 Congris: made with red beans, the beans are cooked first with onion, green chili, garlic, tomato, bay leaf, touch of cumin and oregano, salt, and dry wine; before they soften completely, the raw rice is added, letting them cook together, until they consume the broth and the rice is dry and loose. The beans are also prepared in their broth with the rice separate.
 Dominican Republic:  Moro de guandules, rice and pigeon peas, similar to Panama and Puerto Rico dishes
 El Salvador:  Casamiento;  despite not having a Caribbean coast, this dish is very typical in El Salvador
 Ghana: Waakye, a Ghanaian beans and rice dish 
 Guatemala:  casado; regionally known as gallo pinto and rice and beans
 On the Caribbean coast and parts of eastern or eastern Guatemala (Izabal): it is known as rice and beans and it includes coconut milk.
 Honduras:  Casamiento; on the Caribbean coast it is known as rice and beans and it includes coconut milk and chilli flakes
 India: Rajma, an Indian bean dish usually served with rice
 Israel: Orez shu'it, a traditional Israeli beans and rice dish
 Caribbean coast: rice and beans
 Japan: Okowa, specifically sekihan, azuki beans and glutinous rice. In  red bean mochi, the rice is processed into a bun form. 
Jamaica:  rice and peas
 Korea, Kongbap (bean rice), patbap (red bean rice)
 Mexico:  pispiote, rice and beans
 Nicaragua:   gallo pinto, and in the Nicaraguan Caribbean Coast, as in other countries, it is called "rice and beans" and is made with coconut milk.
 Panama:  gallopinto
 Caribbean coast (Colón, Bocas del Toro): known as rice and beans, and prepared with coconut milk, like in the Dominican Republic.
 Peru: There are two main variations:
 calentado 
 tacu-tacu
 Puerto Rico:
 arroz junto; made with red beans or pigeon beans, and prepared with meat all in same pot.
 arroz con gandules a part of Puerto Rico's national dish which is rice with pigeon peas.
 Spain: Paella
 Suriname: bruine bonen met rijst, one-pot dish with mixed meats and kidney beans, served with rice.
 Trinidad and Tobago:  rice and peas
 United States: 
 Hoppin' John,  a black-eyed peas dish from the southern United States
 Red beans and rice, the most common beans and rice dish in Louisiana Creole cuisine
 Venezuela: These dishes may include fried plantains called "tajadas" as it is commonly found in many Venezuelan dishes:
 Pabellón criollo: Made with rice, beans or refried black beans and well seasoned shredded beef. It is then surrounded by slices of ripe fried plantain. The plantain give the name "Pabellon con barandas".
 Arroz con caraotas: When Pabellón Criollo omits the fried plantains, it has a different name. It is colloquially known as "poor man's lunch" since it is more common in low-income families. However, it can be made and enjoyed by whomever. Fried eggs can also be included. 
 Palo A pique llanero: Made with rice, brown beans and well seasoned shredded beef, chicken and pork. It is surrounded by slices of ripe plantain and pieces of potatoes. Some areas like Barinas, Apure or Bolivar add green plantains.
Liberia : In most parts of West Africa, beans are cooked separately from rice. Flavorful kidney beans can be eaten as a soup on top of rice during special occasions.

Other languages 

Rice and beans is referred to as arroz y habas, arroz con habichuelas, arroz con frijoles, gallo pinto, recalentao or similar in Spanish, arroz e feijão, arroz com feijão or feijão com arroz in Portuguese, risi e bisi in Venetian language, diri ak pwa in Haitian Creole, avas kon arroz or avikas kon arroz in Judaeo-Spanish.

See also

References

Bibliography 
Embrapa, Origem e História do Arroz and Origem e História do Feijão 
Arroz e Feijão: Uma dupla infalível, Camaquã Alimentos

External links 

Embrapa - Empresa Brasileira de Pesquisa Agropecuária 

Rice dishes
Legume dishes
Food combinations